Martin Buglione (born 19 June 1968) is an English former footballer. He played in the Scottish Premier Division for St Johnstone, and also played for a large number of English non-league clubs. He was most successful at Margate, where in two spells he scored 158 goals, an all-time club record, and he also played for a host of other clubs including Tonbridge Angels, Welling United, Sittingbourne, Ashford Town (Kent), Dartford, Enfield, Boreham Wood, Walthamstow Avenue, Hayes, Purfleet and Hampton & Richmond Borough.

In 2007, he was working as reserve team manager for Broxbourne Borough V & E.

Personal life
In 2020, Buglione appeared on TV dating show First Dates Hotel. He stated that he was divorced with adult children and a grandchild, lived in Leigh-on-Sea and worked as a roofer.

References

External links
Martin Buglione profile, Margate Football Club History 

1968 births
Living people
Association football forwards
English footballers
Enfield F.C. players
Walthamstow Avenue F.C. players
Boreham Wood F.C. players
Dagenham F.C. players
Welling United F.C. players
Tonbridge Angels F.C. players
Margate F.C. players
Alma Swanley F.C. players
St Johnstone F.C. players
Sittingbourne F.C. players
Hayes F.C. players
Ebbsfleet United F.C. players
Hampton & Richmond Borough F.C. players
Deal Town F.C. players
Thurrock F.C. players
Dartford F.C. players
Maidstone United F.C. players
Great Wakering Rovers F.C. players
Erith & Belvedere F.C. players
Ashford United F.C. players
National League (English football) players
Scottish Football League players
English people of Italian descent